St. Stanislaus Church or St. Stanislaus Catholic Church or variants thereof, may refer to:

Poland

 St. Stanislaus Kostka Church (Warsaw), or the Sanctuary of Blessed Jerzy Popiełuszko

United States

 St. Stanislaus Parish (Bristol, Connecticut)
 St. Stanislaus Parish (Meriden, Connecticut)
 St. Stanislaus Parish (New Haven, Connecticut)
 St. Stanislaus Kostka Parish, Waterbury, Waterbury, Connecticut
 St. Stanislaus Catholic Church (Lewiston, Idaho), listed on the NRHP in Idaho
 St. Stanislaus Kostka Mission, Rathdrum, Idaho, listed on the NRHP in Idaho
 St. Stanislaus Catholic Church (South Bend, Indiana)
 St. Stanislaus Bishop and Martyr Roman Catholic Church, Detroit, Michigan, listed on the NRHP in Michigan
 Church of St. Stanislaus-Catholic, Winona, Minnesota, listed on the NRHP in Minnesota
 St. Stanislaus Kostka Church (St. Louis, Missouri), St. Louis, Missouri, listed on the NRHP in Missouri
 St. Stanislaus Kostka Church (Rochester, New York)
 St. Stanislaus Catholic Church (Omaha, Nebraska)
 St. Stanislaus Catholic Church (Nashua, New Hampshire)
 Saint Stanislaus Roman Catholic Church Complex, Amsterdam, New York, listed on the NRHP in New York
 Church of St. Stanislaus, Bishop and Martyr (Buffalo, New York), Buffalo, New York
 St. Stanislaus Church Historic District, Warsaw, North Dakota, listed on the NRHP in North Dakota
 St. Stanislaus Church (Cleveland, Ohio), listed on the NRHP in Ohio
 St. Stanislaus Institute, Newport Township, Pennsylvania, listed on the NRHP in Pennsylvania
 St. Stanislaus Kostka Church (Pittsburgh), Pittsburgh, Pennsylvania, listed on the NRHP in Pennsylvania
 St. Stanislaus Catholic Church (Milwaukee, Wisconsin)

See also 
 Saint Stanislaus (disambiguation)
 Stanislav (disambiguation)